Bill Sherk is a Canadian writer and journalist and is an authority on old cars. Affectionately known as "The old car detective", he predominantly writes books and articles on old cars and the stories behind them and their owners. He has written hundreds of newspaper articles about people and their cars, and is currently syndicated in over 25 newspapers.

He currently lives in Leamington, Ontario, Canada.

Works 
60 Years Behind the Wheel: Cars We Drove in Canada, 1900-1960 - 2003
500 Years of New Words: The Fascinating Story of How, Why, and When Hundreds of Your Favourite Words Entered the English Language - 2004
I'll Never Forget My First Car: Stories From Behind the Wheel - 2005

External links 
Web site about Bill Sherk's books

Living people
Year of birth missing (living people)
Canadian journalists
People from Leamington, Ontario